Liquid Dreams is a 1991 American erotic thriller starring Candice Daly. Liquid Dreams had some cult film buzz, mainly due to the movie's slight comparisons to the 1983 film Videodrome. The film was screened at the International Critics' Week of the 1991 Cannes Film Festival.

Plot
Set in the near future, Eve Black (Daly) auditions successfully in a futuristic strip club where a movie called Neurovid, Dorothy and the Wizard of Oz is being filmed. Eve has a device put in her ears that turn white to star in a hot movie for her director Ceceil and becomes the latest star of Neurovid and is tested before being filmed. From here, she starts to solve the murder of her sister Tina.

References

External links 
 

1991 films
American science fiction thriller films
American erotic thriller films
1990s science fiction thriller films
1990s erotic thriller films
1990s English-language films
1990s American films